Campaign for State Education (CASE) is a UK national education campaign group for an accountable, inclusive, and properly funded state education system. CASE demands a fully comprehensive school system.

CASE opposes Private Finance Initiative financing for schools, fragmenting state funded education by creating different structures and rules for schools, and selective school admissions policies based on ability or religion which exclude other children from the community.

References

External links
Campaign for State Education

Comprehensive education
Educational organisations based in the United Kingdom
Organisations based in the London Borough of Hackney
Stamford Hill